Paradise (Italian: Paradiso) is a 1932 Italian comedy film directed by Guido Brignone and starring Nino Besozzi, Sandra Ravel and Lamberto Picasso. It was part of a group of "White Telephone" films made during the decade. It was produced by Cines, the largest Italian film studio at the time.

Cast
 Nino Besozzi as Max  
 Sandra Ravel as Eva  
 Lamberto Picasso as Il prestigiatore  
 Calisto Bertramo as Il presidente della società zoofila  
 Olga Capri as Una congressista  
 Pio Campa 
 Giuseppe Pierozzi 
 Giacomo Almirante 
 Oreste Bilancia 
 Alfredo Martinelli 
 Giacomo Moschini 
 Turi Pandinolfi 
 Roberto Pasetti 
 Alfredo Robert 
 Carlo Simoneschi 
 Gino Viotti

References

Bibliography 
 Wheeler Winston Dixon & Gwendolyn Audrey Foster. A Short History of Film. Rutgers University Press, 2008.

External links 
 

1932 comedy films
Italian comedy films
1932 films
1930s Italian-language films
Films directed by Guido Brignone
Italian black-and-white films
1930s Italian films